Miguel Castaño Quiñones (23 February 1883 in León, Spain - 21 November 1936) was a Spanish socialist politician, engineer and journalist, member of Parliament during the Second Spanish Republic and the first democratically elected Mayor of León, serving until his assassination in 1936 by Francoist rebels during the Spanish Civil War.

External links
   Congreso de los Diputados

1883 births
1936 deaths
People from León, Spain
Spanish Socialist Workers' Party politicians
Members of the Congress of Deputies of the Second Spanish Republic
Mayors of places in Castile and León
Politicians from Castile and León
Spanish people of the Spanish Civil War (Republican faction)
Assassinated Spanish politicians
Assassinated mayors
20th-century Spanish journalists